Dr. Madhusudan Kendre is an Indian politician and member of the Nationalist Congress Party. He won the  Gangakhed Constituency with 58415 votes in the 2014 Assembly Election, Parbhani District of Maharashtra.

On 22 March 2017, Kendre was suspended along with 18 other MLAs until 31 December for interrupting Maharashtra Finance Minister Sudhir Mungantiwar during a state budget session and burning copies of the budget outside the assembly four days earlier.

Positions held 
Maharashtra Legislative Assembly MLA
Terms in office 2014-2019

References

Living people
Maharashtra MLAs 2014–2019
Marathi politicians
Nationalist Congress Party politicians from Maharashtra
Dr. Babasaheb Ambedkar Marathwada University alumni
Year of birth missing (living people)